Michael Haas may refer to:

 Michael Haas (political scientist) (born 1938), professor at California Polytechnic University, Pomona
 Mike Haas (born 1958), American soccer player
 Michael Haaß (born 1983), German handball player